Musa sabuana is a species of banana first described by K.Prasad, A.Joe, Bheem., & B.R.P.Rao. It is a member of the genus Musa.

Range
It was first identified in the area of the Panchavati and Ramakrishnapur Dam in the Andaman Islands. It is found in the Middle and Little Andamans.

References 

sabuana
Flora of the Andaman Islands